Ed was an unincorporated community in  Casey County, Kentucky, United States.

Ed has been noted for its short place name.

References

Unincorporated communities in Casey County, Kentucky
Unincorporated communities in Kentucky